Lieutenant General Sir James Watson KCB (1772 – 14 August 1862) was a British Army officer and Commander-in-Chief, India.

Military career
Watson was commissioned into the 14th Regiment of Foot reaching the rank of major in 1802. He was appointed commanding officer of the 1st Battalion of his regiment in 1807 and served in India and Batavia.

In March 1835 he was appointed Commander-in-Chief, India and continued in that role until September; two years later he was promoted to lieutenant general and made colonel of the 14th Foot, a position he held until his death.

He was also an active member of the Army and Navy Club. He lived in Wendover in Buckinghamshire.

He died in 1862. He had married Sarah, with whom he had at least a son and a daughter.

References

|-

1772 births
1862 deaths
People from Buckinghamshire
British Army lieutenant generals
West Yorkshire Regiment officers
Knights Commander of the Order of the Bath
British Commanders-in-Chief of India
North Staffordshire Regiment officers
Military personnel from Buckinghamshire